Women's lacrosse (or girls' lacrosse), sometimes shortened to lax, is a sport with twelve players on the field at a time (including the goalkeeper). Originally played by indigenous peoples of the Americas, the modern women's game was introduced in 1890 at the St Leonard's School in St Andrews, Scotland. The rules of women's lacrosse differ significantly from men's field lacrosse. The two are often considered to be different sports with a common root.

The object of the game is to use a long-handled stick (known as a crosse or lacrosse stick) to catch, cradle, and pass a solid rubber lacrosse ball in an effort to score by hurling the ball into an opponent's goal. Cradling is when a player moves their wrists and arms in a semi-circular motion to keep the ball in the pocket of the stick's head using centripetal force. The head of the lacrosse stick has a mesh or leather net strung into it that allows the player to hold the ball. Defensively, the object is to keep the opposing team from scoring and to dispossess them of the ball through the use of stick checking and body positioning. The rules of women's lacrosse are different from the men's lacrosse game. Equipment required to play is also different from the men's. In the United States, women are only required to wear eyewear or lacrosse goggles and a mouth guard. The stick has restrictions too, as it must be a certain length and the pocket must be shallow enough to show the ball above the side when held at eye level.

At the collegiate level in the United States, lacrosse is represented by the National Collegiate Athletic Association (NCAA), which conducts three NCAA Women's Lacrosse Championships, one for each of its competitive divisions, each spring. Internationally, women's lacrosse has a thirty-one-member governing body called World Lacrosse, which sponsors the Women's Lacrosse World Cup once every four years.

History

Lacrosse is a traditional Native American game, which was first witnessed by Europeans when French Jesuit missionaries in the St. Lawrence Valley witnessed the game in the 1630s. The games were sometimes major events that could last several days. As many as 100 to 1,000 men from opposing villages or tribes would participate. Native American lacrosse describes a broad variety of stick-and-ball games played by them. Geography and tribal customs dictated the extent to which women participated in these early games:
"Lacrosse, as women play it, is an orderly pastime that has little in common with the men's tribal warfare version except the long-handled racket or crosse (stick) that gives the sport its name. It's true that the object in both the men's and women's lacrosse is to send a ball through a goal by means of the racket, but whereas men resort to brute strength the women depend solely on skill." Rosabelle Sinclair

The first modern women's lacrosse game was played in 1890 at the St Leonards School in Scotland, where women's lacrosse had been introduced by Louisa Lumsden. Lumsden brought the game to Scotland after watching a men's lacrosse game between the Canghuwaya (probably Caughnawaga) Indians and the Montreal Lacrosse Club. A British school teacher, Cara Gascoigne, at Sweet Briar College, started club lacrosse at that college in 1914. One of Lumsden's students, Rosabelle Sinclair, established the first women's lacrosse team in the United States at the Bryn Mawr School in Baltimore, Maryland in 1926. The first women's intercollegiate game was held between Sweet Briar College and The College of William and Mary in 1941.

Until the mid-1930s, women's and men's field lacrosse were played under virtually the same rules, with no protective equipment. In the United States, the formation of the U.S. Women's Lacrosse Association led to a change in these rules.

Rules

Women's lacrosse is played with a team of 10 players (12 in USA collegiate play), including the goalkeeper during usual play. The ball used is typically yellow, unless both teams agree to use a different colored ball. It is usually yellow because it makes it easier for people to see the ball in the air and in another player's stick. The duration of the game is 60 minutes, (50 under NFHS/US Lacrosse rules) with four quarters. Halftime is ten minutes unless both the coaches agree on less than ten minutes prior to the start of the game. Each team is allowed two 90-second team time-outs per game (two 2-minute timeouts in the USA). In the US, a time-out may be requested by the head coach or any player on the field after a goal is scored or any time the requestor's team is in clear possession of the ball. With the addition of free-movement to both US Lacrosse and NCAA rule sets, players are no longer required to drop their sticks in place during a timeout.

Before a game can begin, every stick that each player is planning on using during the game must be approved by the referee based on a set of standards created by the U.S. Lacrosse and NCAA. These standards are constantly changing as new sticks are being created by different lacrosse companies. Often a standard lacrosse ball is placed into the head of the stick and viewed by the referee at his/her eye level. If the ball cannot be seen over the top of either side of the head, then the pocket is most likely too deep for play. A pocket that is deeper than regulation causes an unfair advantage to that individual with the stick. If the stick pocket is too deep, this can often be fixed by tightening the stringing. If a stick is strung incorrectly by the manufacturer, the stick cannot be used in the game. An example of stick stringing regulation is that the shooting string attachment must be 3.5 inches from the top of the head. After someone scores a goal, the referee has the right to ask to check her stick. If the stick's pocket is to deep or the stick does not follow the standards now for some reason, the goal will be called back. Also, on a winning shot the other team is allowed to challenge the player's stick.

The rules of women's lacrosse differ significantly from men's lacrosse. The details that follow are the USA college rules. International women's lacrosse rules are slightly different.

The women's lacrosse game saw numerous rule changes in 2000. Modifications included limiting the number of players allowed between the two restraining lines on the draw to five players per team. Stick modifications have led to offset heads, which allow the women's game to move faster and makes stick moves and tricks easier. The stick is now more similar to the men's stick, with a deeper pocket and more rounded head. In 2002, goggles became mandatory equipment in the United States (but not a requirement in international rules). In 2006, hard boundaries were adopted. Prior to hard boundaries, umpires stopped play when the action moved too far away. Passes that were thrown out of bounds would be awarded to the team closest to the ball. After this rule change, balls lost out of bounds became turnovers, except on a shot. There are calls, such as shooting space which is when a defender runs directly up to the player about to shoot. To avoid this call, the defender must run up at an angle to the player about to shoot. This rule is to keep the players safe.

In 2013 women's NCAA lacrosse included a changed rule on defending. When their team does not possess the ball, players in their defending end of the field may run through any portion of the goal circle (8 meter circle around the goal) for as long as three seconds. Only the defensive player who is directly marking the ball carrier within a stick's length may remain in the goal circle while defending. Players that are on attack are allowed to run through the goal circle, but only in collegiate games; high school players are not allowed through the goal circle.

In 2015, for the 2016 season, there were a few other major rule changes. Players are now allowed to kick the ball in order to get it out of traffic. In the past, kicking the ball would result in a change of possession. Also, players are now allowed to self-start after an opposing player commits a minor foul against them. Before moving forward, one must stand still in an athletic stance before self-starting to let the referee know the player is ready to continue with game play.

In 2016, for the 2017 season, Division I implemented a 90-second possession shot clock, which was added to Divisions II and III in the following year.

In the summer of 2017, the NCAA added more major changes. Prior to the newest addition, all players needed to stop play upon whistle of the referee. Play was resumed upon another whistle or continuation by self-start. Now, free movement has been implemented, meaning upon the whistle for a foul, play does not stop unless for halftime or the end of the game–this is similar to soccer. Also, the defense is now allowed to run through the crease of the lacrosse goal. For the draw now only 3 players, instead of 5 players, will be allowed into the midfield area until possession has been established. Last, a player must move out of the eight diagonally after a penalty has been called.

Players

Traditionally, women played with three attackers (starting with the position closest to the net that a team is shooting at, the attack positions are called "first home", "second home", and "third home"), five midfielders (a "right attack wing", a "left attack wing", a "right defensive wing", a "left defensive wing", and a "center"), three defenders (starting from the position closest to the net a team is defending, these positions are called "point", "cover point", and "third man"), and one goalie. The positions used to be pinned on the players, and the players used to be required to be marked on defense by their opposite number (third man or "3M" covering the opposing third home "3H").

Today, under North American rules, seven players play attack at one time and seven defenders are present. Generally, a team has four attackers, four close defenders, and three midfielders. There is a restraining line that keeps the four defensive players (plus the goalie) from going into the attack, or four attackers from going into the defensive zone. If those players cross the line and participate in the play, they are considered offside and a major foul is called.

Equipment
Women's lacrosse rules are specifically designed to limit physical contact between players. As a result of the lack of contact, the only protective equipment required are a mouth guard and face guard/goggles. Although headgear is not required (except for the U.S. state of Florida, where it is mandatory for girls lacrosse players), it is considered for lacrosse players due to the risk of head injury. In 2017 Brown University purchased headgear for its team and was the first NCAA program to make helmets available to the whole team.

Players must wear eye protection according to U.S. Lacrosse rules. All field players must properly wear eye protection that meets ASTM specification standard F803 for women's adult/ youth lacrosse for the appropriate level of play. All players must wear a professionally manufactured intra-oral mouthpiece that fully covers the teeth. The mouthguard must include portions protecting and separating the biting surfaces and protecting the teeth and supporting structures and has to cover the posterior teeth with adequate thickness. Most referees do not allow mouth guards to be white or clear colored as it is too difficult for them to distinguish between the mouth guard and the player's teeth. Mouth pieces must be worn at all times and cannot be taken out in the middle of play. No protruding tabs are allowed for field players.

In addition, players may choose to wear gloves, and jewelry is not allowed to be worn. Although the rules specify these types of protection, injuries still occur from accidental checks to the head and the overall nature of the sport.

Players must wear composition or rubber soled shoes. No spikes are allowed. Plastic, leather, or rubber cleats-studs may be worn. Shoes and socks are not required to be identical for team members.

The pockets of women's sticks are shallower than those of the men, making the ball more difficult to catch and to shoot at high speed. The pockets also make it harder to cradle without dropping the ball. The crosse of a women's stick may be 35.5 inches and no longer than 43.25 according to the NCAA girls lacrosse committee.

The crosse (lacrosse stick) is divided into two parts, the shaft and the head. The shaft can be made of a variety of materials such as wood, aluminum and composite materials depending on what position the player prefers. Women's lacrosse rules mandate that only composite and aluminum shafts can be used, due to accidental checks and hitting that can happen during the duration of the games. The top of the stick is where the head joins the shaft to make the whole stick. The head is made of compact plastic where the mesh, sidewall and pocket form.

There are different mesh types made from materials which affect the shot accuracy and handling of the ball. The sidewall is the siding of the head that affects the depth of the pocket and stiffness the feel when handling the ball. More stiff sidewalls and heads are better to use for defense players who want to check harder. More flexible sidewalls are better use of picking up groundballs, movement and face-offs. The pocket is made from mesh, and with these different meshes they can have different capabilities; a wide pocket allows and easier time catching balls, but will also cause less ball control, while a smaller head will allow the user a more hard time catching the ball but lends greater accuracy. The pocket of the lacrosse stick can often be easily adjusted to ensure the depth of the pocket is legal and meets the players preference before the start of a game.

The lacrosse ball is made of solid rubber and can be yellow, orange, blue or green. All lacrosse balls must meet NOCSAE (National Operating Committee on Standards for Athletic Equipment) standards.

Playing area

The size of the playing field depends on the players' age group. For U15 and U13 players, they must play on a regulation sized field with all appropriate markings. For U11, they must play on a regulation sized field with all appropriate markings whenever possible. Otherwise, they may play on a modified field with reduced players. For U9 players the fields must be rectangular, between 60–70 yards in length and 30–40 yards in width to accommodate play on existing fields.

Under World Lacrosse rules, there are two different areas around the goal on both sides of the field: the 3 meter goal circle around the goal (called the "crease") and the 11-meter arc. The players are never allowed to enter the crease on their attack side of the field. However, defenders are allowed to run through the crease while actively marking an attacker. Only the goalkeeper is allowed to remain stationary inside the crease. If a defensive foul occurs inside the 11-meter arc, all players that were previously inside the penalty area (defined as the area inside the 11-meter arc and the space within and between the restart dots that are behind the goal) must move to a location outside of the penalty area. The player who was fouled, now moves to the nearest hash mark that is located around the edges of the arc and has a direct lane to goal. The defender who committed the foul is relocated 4 meters directly behind the shooter. If a player fouled another player not in the arc, the victim receives the ball and the player who fouled must back away at least 4 meters. All other players standing closer than 4 meters to the ball holder must also back away to give the player room to move with the ball. If outside the 11-meter arc, the offended player regains the ball and the person who committed the foul is relocated 4 meters behind the offender. Outside the 11-meter arc the game may be restarted by the offended player self-starting.

Under USA college rules, the two different areas around the goal on both sides of the field are the 8-meter arc and the 12-meter fan. When committing a major foul inside either of these areas, the offense regains the ball and has a direct opportunity to shoot at the goal. If outside the 8-meter arc, but inside the fan, a "lane" to goal is cleared of all other players and the person who committed the foul is relocated 4 meters behind the offender. If inside the 8-meter-arc and a defensive foul occurs, all players that were previously inside the penalty area (defined as the area inside the 8 meter arc, the two pie shaped areas on either side of the arc, and the space within and between the restart dots that are behind the goal) must move to a location outside of the penalty area. The player who was fouled, now moves to the nearest hash mark that is located around the edges of the arc and has a direct lane to goal. The defender who committed the foul is relocated on the 12-meter fan directly behind the shooter. If a player fouled another player not in the arc, the victim receives the ball and the player who fouled must back away at least 4 meters. All other players standing closer than 4 meters to the ball holder must also back away to give the player room to move with the ball.

The shooting space rule in women's lacrosse is very important in keeping the players safe. It occurs when a defender moves into the offender's shooting lane to goal, while not marking an opponent at an angle that makes the defender at risk of being hit by the ball if the offender were to shoot. A shooting space violation calls for an immediate whistle by the umpire, granted that the attacking player with the ball would have the opportunity to shoot, and the attacker will be awarded a free position from the nearest hash mark on the 11-meter arc. Repeated shooting space violations may result in a yellow card.

Tie-breaking methods
Should a tie remain after regulation, the teams will then play 3-minute golden goal periods until one team scores, which wins the game.

Ball in and out of play
The "draw" is what starts the game and keeps the game going after a goal is scored. The draw is when two players, one from each team, stand in the center circle with the backs of their sticks facing each other. Then the referee places the ball between the two sticks. Each player has to push their sticks together parallel to the ground to contain the ball. There are allowed two players to stand along the circle surrounding the center circle during the draw. The players’ sticks around the circle cannot break the line until the whistle is blown. The centers must lift and pull their sticks over their heads releasing the ball. If one player taking the draw moves or lifts their stick before the other player, it is penalized as an illegal draw.

When the referee blows the whistle during play, everyone must stop exactly where they are. If the ball goes out of bounds on a shot, then the player closest to the ball receives the possession. If the ball goes out of bounds not on a shot then the other team is awarded with the possession. For example, if a player threw a bad pass to her teammate and the ball went out of bounds then the other team would receive the ball. If the ball goes out of bounds on a shot, it is common for the player to reach out her stick in an attempt to be ruled closest to the ball and gain possession.

Protecting one's stick from being checked is a very important key in the game of women's lacrosse.  In order to protect the stick from being checked, the player must cradle the ball. If the player has a strong "cradle", it would make it much more difficult to recover the ball for the opposing team. "Cradling" is the back and forth movement and twisting of the head of the stick, which keeps the ball in the pocket with centripetal force.

Allowable checking is based on what age level of the game is being played. Rules for U15 and above allow lacrosse players full checking above the head. However, this requires that at least one of the two umpires have a USL Local Rating so that they can judge the appropriate amount of contact. In most cases, a check into the head area is a mandatory yellow card. If a sufficiently experienced umpire is not available, then U13 checking rules must be used where modified checking only below the shoulder is allowed. In U11 and U9 no checking is allowed. US Lacrosse rules recommend that Middle School/Junior High players play with U13 checking rules.

In women's lacrosse, players may only check if the check is directed away from the ball carrier's head. Also, players may only check using the side of their stick. If caught by one of the referees using the flat of the head, it will be called as a "held check" and the opposing team will get the ball.

There are two types of fouls in women's lacrosse, major and minor. When a minor foul is committed anywhere on the field, the player who committed the foul is set four meters to whichever side she was last guarding the person she obstructed. If a major foul occurs outside of the twelve meter fan or eight meter arc, the fouler must stand four meters behind the player she fouled.

Penalties
Penalties for women's lacrosse are assessed with the following cards:
 The green card, given to the team, is for a delay of game. A delay of game is issued when a player fails to move 4-meters as directed by the referee, engages too early, jewelry violation, and improper use of equipment. (In NCAA rules, a green card results in a one minute releasable penalty to the player).
 The yellow card is for a first-time penalty and results in the player being removed from the field for two minutes. In the U.S. any player receiving two yellows sits out the rest of the game but is allowed to play in the next game.
 The red card is the result either of two yellow cards or a flagrant foul or extremely unsportsmanlike behavior, and causes the player to be ejected from the game. If the red card is for unsportsmanlike behavior, the player is also not permitted to play in the following game. U.S. rules differ in that a red card is not the result of two yellow cards and any player receiving a red card sits out the rest of that game and her team's next game. This penalty lasts for four minutes under US Lacrosse rules, or two minutes non-releasable under NCAA rules.

Penalties assessed include:

Rough/Dangerous Check
Check to the Head (Mandatory Card)
Slash (Mandatory Card)
Holding
Crosse in the sphere
Illegal cradle
Blocking
Charging
Pushing
Obstruction of the Free Space to Goal (Shooting Space)
Illegal Pick
Tripping
Detaining
Forcing Through
False Start
Dangerous Propelling (Mandatory Card)
Dangerous Follow-Through (Mandatory Card)
Dangerous Shot
Illegal Shot
Covering
Empty Stick Check
Warding off
Illegal Body Ball
Squeezing the Head of the Crosse
Throwing her crosse in any circumstance.
Taking part in the game if she is not holding her crosse.
Illegal Draw
Early entry on draw
Illegal crosse
Scoring a goal with a crosse that does not meet the field crosse specifications.
Adjusting the strings/thongs of her crosse after an official inspection of her crosse has been requested during the game. The crosse must be removed.
Jewelry
Illegal Uniform
Illegal Substitution
Delay of game
Play from out of bounds
Illegal re-entry
Illegal Timeout

International competition
Beginning in 1972, the sport was governed internationally by the International Federation of Women's Lacrosse Associations (IFWLA). The formation of the IFWLA actually predated that of the corresponding body for men's lacrosse, the International Lacrosse Federation (ILF), by two years.

In August 2008, after negotiations lasting four years, the IFWLA and ILF agreed to merge into a single governing body, the Federation of International Lacrosse (FIL). All tournaments operated by the IFWLA have been taken over by the FIL.

Every four years, the Women's Lacrosse World Cup is held. It was organized by the IFWLA before its merger with the IFL, and is now organized by the FIL. In Oshawa, Canada, in 2013, the United States defeated Canada in the final. The most recent edition was held in Surrey, England in 2017.

Leagues
Athletes Unlimited Lacrosse - A four team league which started play in 2021.

Women's Professional Lacrosse League - Was a four team league which was started in 2018, but ceased operations in 2020.

United Women's Lacrosse League - Was a four team league founded in 2015, but ceased operations in 2018.

Notable players
* Taylor Cummings, the youngest woman and only three-time winner of the Tewaaraton Trophy (2014, 2015, 2016), two-time winner of the Honda Sports Award, two-time champion and three-time IWLCA All-American for the Maryland Terrapins women's lacrosse team, Big Ten Female Athlete of the Year (2015), member of United States women's national lacrosse team
 Katie Schwarzmann, two-time winner of the Tewaaraton Trophy (2012, 2013), member of United States women's national lacrosse team.
 Hannah Nielsen, two-time Tewaaraton Trophy winner (2008, 2009), two-time winner of the Honda Sports Award, four-time champion and three-time IWLCA All-American for the Northwestern Wildcats women's lacrosse team, member of Australia women's national lacrosse team.
 Kristen Kjellman, two-time winner of the Tewaaraton Trophy (2006, 2007)
 Kylie Ohlmiller, current NCAA Division I record-holder for most career and single-season points and assists, played for the Stony Brook Seawolves
 Jen Adams, head coach for the Loyola Greyhounds of Loyola University Maryland, former member of Australia women's national lacrosse team and All-American lacrosse player for the Maryland Terrapins women's lacrosse team, former owner of the career and single-season points record
 Ginny Capicchioni, first woman to play in a professional men's league for the New Jersey Storm of the National Lacrosse League

References
Footnotes

Bibliography

External links
International Federation of Women's Lacrosse Associations
US Lacrosse – The National Governing Body
Women's lacrosse in the United States
Women's lacrosse in England
Women's lacrosse in Wales
Women's field lacrosse in Canada
Women's lacrosse in Australia
Women's lacrosse in the Netherlands
NCAA women's lacrosse stats

 
Sports originating in Scotland